Mount Mocho is a summit in the Diablo Range, in Santa Clara County, California. It rises to an elevation .

References

Mountains of Santa Clara County, California
Diablo Range